Hochstetterbreen is a glacier in Olav V Land on Spitsbergen, Svalbard. It debouches into Hinlopen Strait. The glacier is named after Austrian geographer Ferdinand von Hochstetter.

References

Glaciers of Spitsbergen